Memorial Hall station could refer to:

 Memorial Hall station (PAAC), a light rail station in Pittsburgh, Pennsylvania
 Chiang Kai-shek Memorial Hall MRT station, a rapid transit station in Taipei
 Sun Yat-sen Memorial Hall MRT station, a rapid transit station in Taipei
 Sun Yat-sen Memorial Hall station (Guangzhou Metro), a rapid transit station in Guangzhou